The Junkers were members of the landed nobility in Prussia. They owned great estates that were maintained and worked by peasants with few rights. These estates often lay in the countryside outside of major cities or towns. They were an important factor in Prussia and, after 1871, in German military, political and diplomatic leadership. The most famous Junker was Chancellor Otto von Bismarck. Bismarck held power in Germany from 1871 to 1890 as Chancellor of the German Empire. He was removed from power by Kaiser Wilhelm II.
  
Many Junkers lived in the eastern provinces that were annexed by either Poland or the Soviet Union after World War II. Junkers fled or were expelled alongside other German-speaking population by the incoming Polish and Soviet administrations, and their lands were confiscated. In western and southern Germany, the land was often owned by small independent farmers or a mixture of small farmers and estate owners, and this system was often contrasted with the dominance of the large estate owners of the east. Before World War II, the dividing line was often drawn at the river Elbe which was also roughly the western boundary of Slavic settlement by the Wends in the so called Germania Slavica prior to Ostsiedlung. The term for the junker dominated East was thus Ostelbien or East Elbia. They played a big role in repressing the liberal movement in Germany.

Origins

Junker is derived from Middle High German Juncherre, meaning "young nobleman" or otherwise "young lord" (derivation of jung and Herr), and originally was the title of members of the higher edelfrei (immediate) nobility without or before the accolade. It evolved to a general denotation of a young or lesser noble, often poor and politically insignificant, understood as "country squire" (cf. Martin Luther's disguise as "Junker Jörg" at the Wartburg; he would later mock King Henry VIII of England as "Juncker Heintz"). As part of the nobility, many Junker families only had prepositions such as von or zu before their family names without further ranks. The abbreviation of the title is Jkr., most often placed before the given name and titles, for example: Jkr. Heinrich von Hohenberg. The female equivalent Junkfrau (Jkfr.) was used only sporadically. In some cases, the honorific Jkr. was also used for Freiherren (Barons) and Grafen (Counts).

A good number of poorer Junkers took up careers as soldiers (Fahnenjunker), mercenaries, and officials (Hofjunker, Kammerjunker) at the court of territorial princes. These families were mostly part of the German medieval Uradel and had carried on the colonization and Christianization of the northeastern European territories during the Ostsiedlung. Over the centuries, they had become influential commanders and landowners, especially in the lands east of the Elbe River in the Kingdom of Prussia.

As landed aristocrats, the Junkers owned most of the arable land in Prussia. Being the bulwark of the ruling House of Hohenzollern, the Junkers controlled the Prussian Army, leading in political influence and social status, and owning immense estates worked by tenants. These were located especially in the north-eastern half of Germany (i.e. the Prussian provinces of Brandenburg, Pomerania, Silesia, West Prussia, East Prussia and Posen). This was in contrast to the predominantly Catholic southern states such as the Kingdom of Bavaria or the Grand Duchy of Baden, where land was owned by small farms, or the mixed agriculture of the western states like the Grand Duchy of Hesse or even the Prussian Rhine and Westphalian provinces.

Junkers formed a tightly knit elite. Their challenge was how to retain their dominance in an emerging modern state with a growing middle and working class.

Modern influences

The Junkers held a virtual monopoly on all agriculture in the part of the German Reich lying east of the River Elbe. Since the Junker estates were necessarily inherited by the eldest son alone, younger sons, all well educated and with a sense of noble ancestry, turned to the civil and military services, and dominated all higher civil offices, as well as the officer corps. Around 1900 they modernized their farming operations to increase productivity. They sold off less productive land, invested more heavily in new breeds of cattle and pigs, used new fertilizers, increased grain production, and improved productivity per worker. Their political influence achieved the imposition of high tariffs that reduced competition from American grain and meat.

During World War I, Irish nationalist MP Tom Kettle compared the Anglo-Irish landlord class to the Prussian Junkers, saying, "England goes to fight for liberty in Europe and for junkerdom in Ireland."

Their political influence extended from the German Empire of 1871–1918 through the Weimar Republic of 1919–1933. It was said that "if Prussia ruled Germany, the Junkers ruled Prussia, and through it the Empire itself". A policy known as Osthilfe ("Help for the East") granted Junkers 500,000,000 marks in subsidies to help pay for certain debts and to improve equipment. Junkers continued to demand and receive more and more subsidies, which gave them more money in their pockets, thus resulting in political power. Junkers exploited a monopoly on corn by storing it to drive up the price. As more money was profited, they were able to control political offices. Junkers were able to force people to continue paying more money for their product, while keeping who they wanted in office. Through the controlling of politics behind a veil, Junkers were able to influence politicians to create a law that prohibited collecting of debts from agrarians, thus pocketing even more money and strengthening their power.

Supporting monarchism and military traditions, Junkers were seen as reactionary, anti-democratic, and protectionist by liberals and Socialists, as they had sided with the conservative monarchist forces during the Revolution of 1848. Their political interests were served by the German Conservative Party in the Reichstag and the extraparliamentary Agriculturists' League (Bund der Landwirte). This political class held tremendous power over industrial classes and government alike, especially through the Prussian three-class franchise. When the German chancellor Leo von Caprivi in the 1890s reduced the protective duties on imports of grain, these landed magnates demanded and obtained his dismissal; and in 1902, they brought about a restoration of such duties on foodstuffs as would keep the prices of their own products at a high level.

"Junker" acquired its current and often pejorative sense during the 19th-century disputes over the domestic policies of the German Empire. The term was used by sociologists such as Max Weber and was even adopted by members of the landed class themselves. Chancellor Otto von Bismarck was a noted Junker, though his family hailed from the Altmark region west of the Elbe. After World War I many Prussian agriculturists gathered in the national conservative German National People's Party (DNVP), the term was also applied to Reich President Paul von Hindenburg, lord at Neudeck in West Prussia, and to the "camarilla" around him urging the appointment of Adolf Hitler as Chancellor of Germany, personified by men like Hindenburg's son Oskar and his West Prussian "neighbour" Elard von Oldenburg-Januschau, who played a vital role in the Eastern Aid (Osthilfe) scandal of 1932/33.

Many World War II field marshals were also members of the Junkers, most notably Gerd von Rundstedt, Fedor von Bock and Erich von Manstein. Many Junkers used forced laborers from Poland and the Soviet Union. Landowners like Helmuth James Graf von Moltke and the members of the Kreisau Circle were part of the resistance to Nazi Germany rule. As World War II turned against Nazi Germany, several senior Junkers in the Wehrmacht participated in Colonel Claus von Stauffenberg's assassination attempt of 20 July 1944. Fifty-eight were executed when the plot failed, among them Erwin von Witzleben and Heinrich Graf von Lehndorff-Steinort, or committed suicide like Henning von Tresckow. During the advance of the Red Army in the closing months of the war and subsequently, most Junkers had to flee from the eastern territories that were turned over to the re-established Republic of Poland with the implementation of the Oder–Neisse line according to the Potsdam Agreement.

Bodenreform

As most of these large estates, especially in Brandenburg and Western Pomerania, had belonged to Junkers, the Socialist Unity Party of Germany promoted their plans with East German President Wilhelm Pieck's slogan Junkerland in Bauernhand! ("Junker land into farmer's hand!"). The former owners were accused of war crimes and involvement in the Nazi regime by the Soviet Military Administration and the SED, with many of them being arrested, brutally beaten and interned in NKVD special camps (Speziallager), while their property was plundered and the manor houses demolished. Some were executed. Many women were raped. From 1952 these individual farms were pressured by a variety of means to join together as collectives and incorporated into Landwirtschaftliche Produktionsgenossenschaften ("agricultural production comradeships", LPG) or nationalised as Volkseigene Güter ("publicly owned estates", VEG).

After German reunification, some Junkers tried to regain their former estates through civil lawsuits, but the German courts have upheld the land reforms and rebuffed claims to full compensation, confirming the legal validity of the terms within the Treaty on the Final Settlement with Respect to Germany (Two Plus Four Agreement) (and incorporated into the Basic Law of the Federal Republic), by which expropriations of land under Soviet occupation were irreversible. The last decisive case was the unsuccessful lawsuit of Prince Ernst August of Hanover in September 2006, when the Federal Administrative Court decided that the prince had no right to compensation for the disseized estates of the House of Hanover around Blankenburg Castle in Saxony-Anhalt. Other families, however, have quietly purchased or leased back their ancestral homes from the current owners (often the German federal government in its role as trustee). A petition for official rehabilitation of the ousted landowners was rejected by the German Bundestag in 2008.

Notable Junkers

Otto von Bismarck
Gebhard Leberecht von Blücher
Manfred von Richthofen
Paul von Hindenburg
Friedrich Wilhelm von Steuben
Christoph II von Dohna
Friedrich Wilhelm von Seydlitz
Alfred von Waldersee
Alfred von Schlieffen
Werner von Siemens
Leonhard Graf von Blumenthal
Josias von Heeringen
Heinrich von Kleist
Joseph von Eichendorff
Ferdinand von Schill
Hans Joachim von Zieten
Ludwig Yorck von Wartenburg
Heinrich Friedrich Karl vom und zum Stein
Helmuth von Moltke the Elder
Helmuth von Moltke the Younger
Gustav von Wangenheim
Alexander von Linsingen
Franz von Hipper
Karl-Jesko von Puttkamer
Kurt Freiherr von Hammerstein-Equord
Claus von Stauffenberg
Heinrich Graf von Einsiedel
Günther von Reibnitz
Alfred von Tirpitz
Erich von Falkenhayn
August von Mackensen
Henning von Tresckow
Walter von Brauchitsch
Fedor von Bock
Oskar von Hindenburg
Wilhelm von Leeb
Erich von Manstein
Hans-Jürgen von Arnim
Hermann von Eichhorn
Otto Liman von Sanders
Helmuth James Graf von Moltke
Wolfram von Richthofen
Peter Yorck von Wartenburg
Marion von Dönhoff
Elard von Oldenburg-Januschau
Veruschka von Lehndorff
Paul Emil von Lettow-Vorbeck
Kurt von Schleicher
Hans von Seeckt
Bernhard von Bülow
Alexander von Kluck
Werner von Blomberg
Lutz Graf Schwerin von Krosigk
Eberhard von Mackensen
Wernher von Braun
Walther von Reichenau
Walther von Seydlitz-Kurzbach
Gerhard von Scharnhorst
August von Gneisenau
Carl von Clausewitz
Albrecht von Roon
Karl vom Stein zum Altenstein
Eugen Anton Theophil von Podbielski
Adolf Wild von Hohenborn
Erwin von Witzleben
Job von Witzleben (historian)
Ludwig Freiherr von und zu der Tann-Rathsamhausen
Gottfried Graf von Bismarck-Schönhausen
Wessel Freytag von Loringhoven
Günther von Kluge
Ernst von Weizsacker
Ulrich von Hassell
Heinrich Graf von Lehndorff-Steinort
Georg von Derfflinger
Erich von Drygalski
Ludwig von Wolzogen
Rudolf von Bennigsen
Heinrich Freiherr von Lüttwitz
Remus von Woyrsch
Gerd von Rundstedt
Lothar von Richthofen
Paul Ludwig Ewald von Kleist
Alfried Krupp von Bohlen und Halbach
Ferdinand von Sammern-Frankenegg
Erich von dem Bach-Zelewski
Franz von Papen
Joachim von Ribbentrop
Franz Pfeffer von Salomon
Werner von Fritsch
Baldur von Schirach
Claus von Bülow
Friedrich Werner von der Schulenburg
Gustav Krupp von Bohlen und Halbach
Konstantin von Neurath
Richard von Weizsacker
Maximilian von Weichs
Friedrich Wilhelm von Lindeiner-Wildau
Chlodwig zu Hohenlohe-Schillingsfürst
Georg von Hertling
Ferdinand von Zeppelin
Hans-Georg von Friedeburg
Robert Ritter von Greim
Adolf von Baeyer
Anthony Lorinthia von Geriasarch

See also
German nobility
 East Elbia
Baltic Germans
Jonkheer, the Dutch cognate and rough equivalent
Gentry

Notes

Bibliography
 Anderson, Margaret Lavinia. "Voter, Junker, Landrat, Priest: The Old Authorities and the New Franchise in Imperial Germany," American Historical Review (1993) 98#5 pp. 1448–1474 in JSTOR
 Stienberg, Jonathan. Bismarck a Life, Oxford University Press, 2011
Carsten, Francis Ludwig.  A history of the Prussian Junkers (1989).
Hagen, William W. Ordinary Prussians – Brandenburg Junkers and Villagers, 1500–1840 (Cambridge University Press, 2007) 
MacDonogh, Giles, After the Reich, Basic Books, (2007) .
Ogg, Frederick Austin, The Governments of Europe, MacMillan Company, 1920.
Ogg, Frederic Austin. Economic Development of Modern Europe, Chap. IX (bibliography, pp. 210–211).
 Torp, Cornelius. "The "Coalition of 'Rye and Iron'" under the Pressure of Globalization: A Reinterpretation of Germany's Political Economy before 1914," Central European History (2010) 43#3 pp 401–427
Weber, Max. "National Character and the Junkers," in  From Max Weber: Essays in Sociology (Routledge classics in sociology) (1991)

External links

.
Conservatism in Germany
German noble titles
Noblemen
Politics of Prussia